Ludwig Ignaz Schupmann (23 January 1851 in Geseke (Westphalia), Germany – 2 October 1920 also in Geseke) was a German professor of architecture and an optical designer. He is principally remembered today for his Medial and Brachymedial telescopes, types of catadioptric reflecting-refracting telescopes with Mangin mirrors that eliminate chromatic aberrations while using common optical glasses. Used in early lunar studies, they are used now in double-star work.

The asteroid 5779 Schupmann is named in his honour.

Works 
Die Medial-Fernrohre - Eine neue Konstruktion für große astronomische Instrumente, Teubner-Verlag, 1899

External links 
Ludwig Schupmann and some Early Medial Telescopes

1851 births
1920 deaths
Architects from North Rhine-Westphalia
Telescope manufacturers
German scientific instrument makers
People from Geseke